Up Till Now: The Autobiography is a 2008 autobiography by actor William Shatner with David Fisher. In the book Shatner discusses several aspects of his life including his childhood, early career struggles, time starring on Star Trek, his career after Star Trek and his marriages.

References in pop culture
Excerpts from the book were read by Sarah Palin on the December 11, 2009 episode of The Tonight Show with Conan O'Brien after Shatner had read excerpts from Palin's memoir, Going Rogue: An American Life.

References

Canadian autobiographies
2008 non-fiction books
Books about Star Trek
Books by William Shatner
Show business memoirs
Thomas Dunne Books books